The TCDD E23000 series are Electric Multiple Units that were built by Hyundai Rotem, with delivery beginning in 2009. The E23000s were built to replace the E8000 and E14000 EMUs. Each set has 3 permanently coupled cars.

They are operated by the Turkish State Railways for commuter service in Ankara and leased by İZBAN A.Ş. (10 EMUs) for commuter service in Izmir. After that all E22100 EMUs ordered by İZBAN A.Ş. will enter in service, these 10 sets will go back to Ankara.

These EMUs also operated in İstanbul (İstanbul-Halkalı Line and Haydarpaşa-Gebze Line) before the closing of these lines for the construction of Marmaray. As E32000 plans are in place to use EMUs, on Marmaray, these sets won't be used in İstanbul any more.

Gallery

References

Turkish railways electric multiple units
İZBAN

25 kV AC multiple units
Hyundai Rotem multiple units